Chondrogenesis is the process by which cartilage is developed.

Cartilage in fetal development
In embryogenesis, the skeletal system is derived from the mesoderm germ layer. Chondrification (also known as chondrogenesis) is the process by which cartilage is formed from condensed mesenchyme tissue, which differentiates into chondrocytes and begins secreting the molecules that form the extracellular matrix.

Early in fetal development, the greater part of the skeleton is cartilaginous. This temporary cartilage is gradually replaced by bone (Endochondral ossification), a process that ends at puberty. In contrast, the cartilage in the joints remains unossified during the whole of life and is, therefore, permanent.

Mineralization
Adult hyaline articular cartilage is progressively mineralized at the junction between cartilage and bone.  It is then termed articular calcified cartilage.  A mineralization front advances through the base of the hyaline articular cartilage at a rate dependent on cartilage load and shear stress.  Intermittent variations in the rate of advance and mineral deposition density of the mineralizing front, lead to multiple "tidemarks" in the articular calcified cartilage.

Adult articular calcified cartilage is penetrated by vascular buds, and new bone produced in the vascular space in a process similar to endochondral ossification at the physis.  A cement line demarcates articular calcified cartilage from subchondral bones.

Repair
Once damaged, cartilage has limited repair capabilities. Because chondrocytes are bound in lacunae, they cannot migrate to damaged areas. Also, because hyaline cartilage does not have a blood supply, the deposition of new matrix is slow. Damaged hyaline cartilage is usually replaced by fibrocartilage scar tissue. Over the last years, surgeons and scientists have elaborated a series of cartilage repair procedures that help to postpone the need for joint replacement.
 
In a 1994 trial, Swedish doctors repaired damaged knee joints by implanting cells cultured from the patient's own cartilage. In 1999 US chemists created an artificial liquid cartilage for use in repairing torn tissue. The cartilage is injected into a wound or damaged joint and will harden with exposure to ultraviolet light.

Synthetic cartilage
Researchers say their lubricating layers of "molecular brushes" can outperform nature under the highest pressures encountered within joints, with potentially important implications for joint replacement surgery.
Each 60-nanometre-long brush filament has a polymer backbone from which small molecular groups stick out. Those synthetic groups are very similar to the lipids found in cell membranes.

"In a watery environment, each of these molecular groups attracts up to 25 water molecules through electrostatic forces, so the filament as a whole develops a slick watery sheath. These sheathes ensure that the brushes are lubricated as they rub past each other, even when firmly pressed together to mimic the pressures at bone joints."

Known as double-network hydrogels, the incredible strength of these new materials was a happy surprise when first discovered by researchers at Hokkaido in 2003. Most conventionally prepared hydrogels - materials that are 80 to 90 percent water held in a polymer network - easily break apart like a gelatin. The Japanese team serendipitously discovered that the addition of a second polymer to the gel made them so tough that they rivaled cartilage - tissue which can withstand the abuse of hundreds of pounds of pressure.

Molecular level 
Bone morphogenetic proteins are growth factors released during embryonic development to induce condensation and determination of cells, during chondrogenesis.  Noggin, a developmental protein, inhibits chondrogenesis by preventing condensation and differentiation of mesenchymal cells.

The molecule sonic hedgehog (Shh) modifies the activation of the L-Sox5, Sox6, Sox9 and Nkx3.2. Sox9 and Nkx3.2 induce each other in a positive feedback loop where Nkx3.2 inactivates a Sox9 inhibitor. This loop is supported by BMP expression. The expression of Sox9 induces the expression of BMP, which causes chondrocytes to proliferate and differentiate.

L-Sox5 and Sox6 share this common role with Sox9. L-Sox5 and Sox6 are thought to induce the activation of the Col2a1 and the Col11a2 genes, and to repress the expression of Cbfa1, a marker for late stage Chondrocytes. L-Sox5 is also thought to be involved primarily in embryonic chondrogenesis, while Sox6 is thought to be involved in post-natal chondrogenesis.

The molecule Indian hedgehog (Ihh) is expressed by prehypertrophic chondrocytes. Ihh stimulates chondrocyte proliferation and regulates chondrocyte maturation by maintaining the expression of PTHrP. PTHrP acts as a patterning molecule, determining the position in which the chondrocytes initiate differentiation.

Sulfation
The SLC26A2 is a sulfate transporter. Defects result in several forms of osteochondrodysplasia.

References

Embryology